HMS Mistletoe was launched in Bermuda in 1809 and foundered in 1816.

Career
Lieutenant Robert Ramsay was appointed to command of Mistletoe on 12 November 1808 and fitted her out.

Mistletoe was employed in protecting the British interests in the Rio de la Plata.

On 8 June they entered Moldonado Bay at the mouth of the Río de la Plata.
 	
On 16 June Agamemnon struck an uncharted shoal near Gorriti Island. She couldn't be gotten off and on 17 June, with the ship listing heavily to starboard, Agamemnons stores and all her crew were taken off by boats from other vessels in the squadron; the following day Captain Rose and his officers left the ship. Mistletoe was one of the vessels coming to Agamemnons assistance.

Mistletoe, and the hired armed brig Pitt were anchored in the harbour of Buenos Aires on 25 May 1810 during May Week, when the revolution broke out in the city.

On the deposition of the Brazilian Viceroy, consequent on the revolution of 25 May 1810, Lieutenant Ramsay took charge of his Excellency's family, and, as he did of that of another ex-Viceroy, conveyed them, with several persons of distinction, at his own expense, to Montevideo.

Early in 1811 Mistletoe departed for England to beg paid off.

Between 12 April and 29 October 1811 Mistletoe was at Portsmouth, undergoing fitting. In 1812–1813 she was in the Channel under (temp) Lieutenant Joseph Williams.

Fate
Mistletoe was serving as a tender to the flagship at Portsmouth and was stationed at Brighton Roads to cruise against smugglers. She was under the command of Lieutenant Wade Blake. He was ordered to cruise between Beachy Head and the Isle of Wight. On 14 December 1816 HMS Algerine sighted Mistletoe some eight miles from Dunnose in a storm of wind. She was never seen again. It was presumed that Mistletoe had foundered soon after.

In early January 2017 a wreck was discovered that was initially believed to be that of Mistletoe, but it turned out to be that of a merchantman.

Citations and references
Citations

References
 
 

Shamrock-class schooners
1809 ships
Schooners of the Royal Navy
Maritime incidents in 1816
Missing ships
Warships lost with all hands
Ships built in Bermuda